Chevello de Rijp (born 11 December 1989 in Amsterdam, Netherlands) is a Dutch footballer who played for Eerste Divisie league club Stormvogels Telstar during the 2008-2009 season.

Personal life
Born in the Netherlands, de Rijp is of Surinamese descent.

References

External links
 voetbal international profile

Dutch footballers
Dutch sportspeople of Surinamese descent
Footballers from Amsterdam
SC Telstar players
Eerste Divisie players
1989 births
Living people
Association football midfielders